The 1954–55 Ashes series consisted of five cricket Test matches, each of six days with five hours play each day and eight ball overs. It formed part of the MCC tour of Australia in 1954–55 and the matches outside the Tests were played in the name of the Marylebone Cricket Club. The England team was captained by Len Hutton, the first professional cricketer to lead an MCC tour of Australia. The Australian team under Ian Johnson was confident of victory, but despite losing the First Test by an innings England won the series 3–1 and retained the Ashes. They were the only touring team to win a series in Australia between 1932–33 and 1970–71 and only the second of three touring teams to win a series in Australia from behind (the other two being England in 1911–12 and the West Indies in 1992–93). The tour is best remembered for the bowling of Frank "Typhoon" Tyson, who was at the time regarded as the fastest, most frightening bowler ever seen in Australia. The series saw a phenomenal concentration of bowling prowess on both sides – four of the bowlers had career Test averages under 21, another five under 25 and the remaining four under 30. Unsurprisingly therefore, the ball dominated the bat for most of the series and each side only topped 300 in an innings twice. Unlike the following series in 1958–59 there were rarely any umpiring disputes and Keith Miller wrote "Mel McInnes, Colin Hoy and Ron Wright were our leading umpires in the 1954–55 M.C.C. tour of Australia, and I have no hesitation in saying that McInnes gave the finest exhibition of umpiring in a Test series that I have experienced".

First Test – Brisbane

Preliminaries
The England spinners had been out of form in the last few games, so the tour selectors (Geoffrey Howard, Len Hutton, Peter May, Bill Edrich and Godfrey Evans) chose four pace bowlers and Hutton was committed to bowling first, though this appears to have been his intention since the start of the tour. He was only the second England captain to play a Test match without a spinner, the only other example being Douglas Jardine in the Second Test at Melbourne in 1932–33, which he lost by 111 runs. Wicket-keeper Godfrey Evans missed the Test because of heat-stroke and was replaced by debutant Keith Andrew. Colin Cowdrey, who had made 110 and 103 in the New South Wales match, and Les Favell, who had opened with 84 and 47 for South Australia against the tourists, also made their debuts. Reg Simpson opened with Hutton after his century against Queensland, but the out of form Bill Edrich had to come in at number 3. There were worries about Ray Lindwall's gastric problems, and Alec Bedser's undiagnosed rash, but in the end both were deemed fit to play. Remembering Bedser's hold over the Australian batsmen and that England still held the Ashes the Australian bookies gave the two sides even odds.

Australia – First Innings
Len Hutton had lost the toss five times in a row in 1953, but this time he won it and he became the first England captain to put Australia in to bat since 1911–12. He then watched his fielders drop 14 catches as Australia piled up 601/8 declared. Keith Andrew dropped Arthur Morris off Bedser on 0, allowing the Australian opener to make 153, adding 202 in 232 minutes for the third wicket with Neil Harvey (162). Alec Bedser had a rash all over his back, but bowled on regardless for 1/131 as another six catches were dropped off his bowling. His ungainly fielding led to him being barracked by the crowd, calling "Old Man" whenever he stopped the ball. Tyson – labouring under a 38-yard run up – went for 1/160 off 29 eight ball overs, but battered the batsmen with bouncers and bruised Morris on the arm several times. He also bowled short and fast at Ray Lindwall after the all-rounder had despatched him to the boundary on his way to 64 not out, which would have serious repercussions in the Second Test at Sydney. "We dropped a considerable number of catches," recalled wicket-keeper Keith Andrew. "Nether were we the fittest team in the world. Compton broke a finger fielding on the first day and Alec Bedser was never well, as was proved when it was discovered that he had developed shingles. One or two of us also got a touch of the sun, but there was no way of getting away from the fact that 'catches win matches'."

England – First Innings
When they finally got to bat on the third day England quickly collapsed to 25/4, but then debutant Colin Cowdrey made 40, adding 72 for the 5th wicket with Trevor Bailey who ground out 88 over 283 minutes. With the "Barnacle" immobile at one end – he took 160 minutes to reach 38 – the Australian bowlers worked their way through the tail until Denis Compton, who had broken the metacarpal bone in his hand on the boundary fence, came at number 11. Before the match a local businessman had promised £100 to the first English batsman to hit a six. Realising that the innings was soon to close, the stonewaller extraordinaire Trevor Bailey hit Ian Johnson into the stands for the prize. The wickets were shared among the Australian bowlers: Ray Lindwall was the best with 3/27 and Ian Johnson took 3/46.

England – Second Innings
Forced to follow on 411 runs behind England did better in the second innings, losing only two early wickets instead of four. Bill Edrich made a battling 88 and put on 124 for the 3rd wicket with Peter May (44), but when Bailey was out for 23 the tail collapsed from 220/5 to 257 all out despite Tyson making his highest Test score of 37 not out. The wickets were again distributed amongst the bowlers with Richie Benaud taking 3/43.

Result
Australia won by an innings and 154 runs to take a 1–0 lead in the series. The papers unanimously criticised Hutton's decision to send Australia in to bat, though they noted he would have done better if England had held onto its chances in the field. John Arlott wrote that neither Len Hutton or Alec Bedser had produced a "larger than life" performance to rescue England. Only once before had a team come from behind to win in Australia, in 1911–12 when the great Sydney Barnes had rescued the side after his captain's mistakes in the First Test. Ian Johnson had more than confirmed his place as Australian captain, even though it was "only" the biggest Australian victory over England since they won by an innings and 332 runs in the First Test on the same ground in 1946–47.

Second Test – Sydney

Preliminaries
In the Second Test Keith Andrew, Reg Simpson and Alec Bedser were unceremoniously dumped from the England team, which they discovered when they saw the batting line up posted in the dressing room. Andrews was not surprised as Godfrey Evans was fit again and it annoyed Simpson, but devastated Bedser, the bedrock of England's bowling attack since the war. Instead the spinners Bob Appleyard and Johnny Wardle were brought into the bowling attack and Tom Graveney stood in for the injured Denis Compton. Australia were not without their troubles, both captain Ian Johnson and his rival Keith Miller were unfit to play so batsman Jim Burke and all-rounder Alan Davidson of New South Wales were brought in as replacements and vice-captain Arthur Morris took command, with Richie Benaud as his vice-captain despite his lack of form and seniority. One piece of good news for the England team was the arrival of  Henry Sayen, a rich American industrialist and cricket fan who was seen as a lucky mascot. He gave financial bonuses to England players for outstanding play and had watched them play Australia in 1953 and the West Indies in 1953–54, when England fought their way out of almost certain defeat. Despite a recent operation and the advice of his doctors he travelled across the world to see England play and dined with the MCC team, Ian Johnson, Sir Donald Bradman and Prime Minister Robert Menzies.

England – First Innings

Morris won the toss and like Hutton at Brisbane put the opposition in, but this time on a fast, green wicket. Here the similarity ended as the Australian bowlers turned up trumps, helped by some superb fielding. Trevor Bailey, acting as makeshift opener, was out for a duck (after 37 minutes) and wickets continued to fall at regular intervals, Ron Archer (3/12) and Bill Johnston (3/56) took most of the wickets and "The Claw" accounted for Hutton's demise. Only Johnny Wardle's top scoring 35 – adding 43 for the last wicket with Brian Statham – managed to pull England up to 154.

Australia – First Innings
Australia replied with 228, the top nine batsmen getting into double figures, but no one reached 50, Ron Archer equalling his best Test score of 49 and Jim Burke making 44. Bailey opened the bowling as well as the batting and took 4/59, but the talking point was Frank Tyson. With his "short" run up of 18–20 yards Tyson took 4/45, described vividly by Margaret Hughes "Harvey received a beast of a ball from Tyson which spat up at him and splashed off his bat to Cowdrey". Ray Lindwall had bowled Tyson for a duck in the England first innings and was bounced again by the England fast bowler.

England – Second Innings

He let me have a very fast, short-pitched delivery...Instinctively I turned a defensive back on the ball which skidded through and hit me a sickening blow on the back of my head. I sank to the ground and as I slipped in and out of consciousness, I was dimly aware of the players gathering round my prostrate body. Indistinctly I heard my fellow batsman Bill Edrich saying: 'My God, Lindy, you've killed him!'...I was very, very angry with Ray Lindwall. And the whole of the Aussie team knew it...I would return the bouncer with interest!. Picture
 Frank Tyson
With Australia 74 runs ahead runs were imperative for England, but they fell to 55/3 before Peter May (104) and Colin Cowdrey (54) came together and made a disciplined stand of 116 "every run a precious inch of ground won back at a moment when the Ashes seemed to have receded almost out of sight...the recovery was shaped by batsmanship of a classic method executed by two young men". May added another 51 with Bill Edrich before being bowled by Lindwall. Strangely, Tyson had been put in to bat at number 7 above Test centurion Godfrey Evans. Lindwall boasted that he never bowled short at tailenders (which didn't bother Tyson), but someone coming to bat at number 7 can be regarded as an all-rounder and the Australian fast bowler made the greatest mistake of his career, he bounced Tyson, who caught the ball on the back of his head and collapsed at the wicket. The Australians anxiously gathered around, players did not wear protective helmets in the 1950s and he had to be helped off the field and taken to hospital for x-rays. He returned to bat sporting a bump on his head that could be seen from the stands, was cheered by the crowd, and made another 8 runs before being bowled by Lindwall. England crashed from 222/4 to 250/9 and once again it was up to the last wicket pair – this time Appleyard (19 not out) and Staham (25) – to add 46 vital runs, taking the score to 296. The strength of the Australian bowling attack prevented any one man taking the lion's share, Archer (3/53), Lindall (3/69) and Bill Johnston (3/70) sharing the wickets between them.

Australia – Second Innings

Australia needed 223 runs to win in over four sessions, which was regarded as not too difficult a task, especially if Frank Tyson was affected by his injury, but instead he was very angry and ready to exact revenge. The Australians were afraid that he would send down a barrage of fast, short-pitched bowling, but Tyson was intelligent enough to bowl full length deliveries that caught them unprepared. Brian Statham bowled the first over from the Paddington End, "up the cellar steps". into a "half a gale", while Tyson tore down the slope from the Randwick End and with the wind behind him and bowled "as fast as man has ever bowled". Statham showed why he was an "unlucky" bowler; Les Favell was dropped in the first over and Arthur Morris was beaten four times before being trapped leg before in the last over before tea to make Australia 27/1. In the first over after tea Favell was out when a ball from Tyson ricocheted off his bat and carried 120 feet to Bill Edrich in the slips, who caught it chest-high. Somehow Jim Burke and Neil Harvey survived the session as they played and missed and Tyson made the ball rear up from a length. Burke didn't score for almost an hour, but by the end of the day they were 72/2 and Australia needed only 151 more runs for victory.

Burke did not long survive the morning as Tyson moved a ball back up the hill to flatten his stumps. Graeme Hole had a high backlift and failed to get his bat down in time to trap a yorker and was clean bowled by Tyson at 77/4. Hutton now rested his fast bowlers and brought on Trevor Bailey and Bob Appleyard to slow down the scoring and tie up the batsman. Richie Benaud was not a patient batsman and took a swipe at "Applecart" which he hit sky high to Tyson in the deep, who only managed to snatch it inches above the grass to have Australia 102/5. Neil Harvey was now getting into his stride and in what many observers thought was the greatest innings of his life, he counter-attacked the bowling, cutting short balls and clipping anything on his pads through the leg side and once hooking Tyson over fine leg's head for four. By lunch he and Ron Archer had taken the score to 118/5 and as long has Harvey was in the Australians thought they could win. After the interval Tyson and Statham were brought back on, with immediate results as Tyson felled Archer's stumps with another fast ball. Alan Davidson lasted only 6 balls before he was caught by the wicket-keeper Godfrey Evans off Statham. Statham was phenomenally accurate, conceding only 45 runs off 19 eight-ball overs. Tyson bled runs at double that rate, as Tom Graveney recalled "I was fielding in the slips and we were having to stand 40 yards off the bat, and still the ball was often going over our heads from edged shots". Ray Lindwall came in fearing the bouncer, and it was his undoing as he turned a Tyson half-volley into a yorker by playing off the back foot and was bowled.

Harvey now started to farm the bowling ruthlessly, protecting the tailenders from Tyson and Statham as he attacked the fast bowlers, but wicket-keeper Gil Langley was bowled by Statham for a duck to leave Australia 145/9, "...which on paper meant that the result was now almost surely ordained: but it scarcely seemed that way on the spot, partly because Harvey was in such devastating form, and equally because the fast bowlers were almost burst". Last man Bill Johnston was in and Australia still needed 78 to win, but protected by Harvey he only had to face 16 balls in the next 40 minutes. Tyson recalled "Bill Johnston did his bit for his team with true Aussie grit. His speciality stroke was a right-handed, one-handed, back-handed, glancing scoop off the line of his bum – cricket's equivalent of tennis' back-handed retrieve. It bought him a dozen runs – plus a considerable amount of pain when he failed to make contact and the ball clipped his maximus gluteus!" Finally Tyson bowled a ball closer to his body on the advice of Statham and a thin edge was enough for Evans to finish the innings and the match. Johnston was out for 11 and Neil Harvey had made a defiant, unbeaten 92, exactly half of the Australian innings of 184 in which no one else made 15. Together they had added 39 for the last wicket and halved the runs required when Johnston came in, it was heroic, but not enough and England won by 38 runs. The other hero of the day was "Typhoon Tyson", who had powered his way through the Australian batting, taking 6/85 (10–130 in the match) with Statham (3/45) in indefatigable support.

Result
England beat Australia by 38 runs to even the series 1–1 and THE TOAST IS: TYPHOON TYSON! was the headline as the papers hailed the new sensation. Arthur Morris told the newspapers "Such fine bowling deserved to win", Don Bradman thought it was the fastest bowling he had ever seen and John Arlott wrote "This was intelligence, rhythm and strength merged into the violent craft of fast bowling". "Seldom has fortune swayed as it did in this game" wrote E.W. Swanton and for years it was regarded as one of the most eventful and exciting Tests seen in Australia. Henry Sayden had danced for joy with MCC Secretary Ronnie Aird at the fall of each Australian wicket, took the entire England team to a celebratory dinner at Prince's Restaurant and handed out bonuses all round.

Third Test – Melbourne

Preliminaries
Despite the loss of the Sydney Test the Australians were still confident, they had won by an innings, England had won narrowly in the absence of the Australian captain Ian Johnson and the great all-rounder Keith Miller, who now returned to the team. Miller was playing despite the advice of his doctor who warned him not to bowl on his injured knee and said himself that he didn't think his back could take the strain of bowling. Len Maddocks replaced Gil Langley as wicket-keeper as the latter had been hit in the eye by a bail in a Sheffield Shield match. England received Denis Compton at the expense of Tom Graveney, but faced a crisis on the first day of the Test when Len Hutton refused to leave his bed because of his fibrositis and a heavy cold. The manager Geoffrey Howard, George Duckworth, Bill Edrich and Godfrey Evans had to persuade him to play so as to not damage the morale of the team, especially as the series was locked at 1–1. Finally Hutton agreed to play and went to the ground. The wicket was worse than Sydney. After the MCC's match against Victoria it had broken up completely had had to be repaired and was covered with cracks even before the Test began.

England – First Innings
Runs did not flow; they were grafted from a pitch which kept the batsman hopping around as delivery after delivery tickled their ribs. Colin was icily superb. For four hours his concentration never wavered...he stroked the ball through the cover and mid-wicket gaps in the field. Shooters became more frequent, but Colin dug them out. When I joined him at the wicket he was a run short of his maiden Test century: a goal he achieved with a scampered single. If he ever scored a better hundred I hope that I am there to see it.

Frank Tyson
Len Hutton won the toss and elected to bat on New Year's Eve, but soon regretted it. Regardless of his crook knee and bad back Miller opened the bowling with a 90-minute spell of 9–8–5–3 to send Hutton, Edrich (the captain's third opening partner in as many Tests) and Compton back to the pavilion in quick time. With Ray Lindwall dismissing Peter May for a duck England were 41/4 and in deep trouble, but according to Ralph Barker, after "Surviving the early horrors through perfect technique, the 22-year-old Cowdrey made 50 out of 69 and 100 out of 158". He completed his maiden Test century, adding 74 with Trevor Bailey (30) and 54 with wicket-keeper Godfrey Evans (20) before falling to Ian Johnson with a ball that "hit the edge of one of the cracks in the wicket, which was now assuming the appearance of a tessellated pavement. It jagged back to pass behind Kipper's pads and hit his leg stump!". Bill O'Reilly, not an easy man to impress, said that it was the best Test innings he had ever seen and aged only 22 Cowdrey was the youngest Englishman to make an Ashes century since Jack Hearne on the same ground in 1912. Although Cowdrey would make 22 Test centuries they would all be measured against the yardstick of his Melbourne hundred, and still it remained greatest innings; "his driving, concentration and command were all faultless...a tribute to his wonderful ability". Ron Archer (4/33) wrapped up the tail and England fell from 181/6 to 191 all out at the end of the first day.

Australia – First Innings
Still the wicket gave hope to the England bowlers and wickets fell at a steady rate throughout New Year's Day to leave Australia 181/8, only Arthur Morris and Les Favell failing to each double figures. The next day was a Sunday and a rest day, but its events were to be of great importance. Fearing that the wicket would break up in the middle of the Test it was surreptitiously and illegally watered to bind the cracks and make it last an extra couple of days. Worse still Percy Barnes of The Age reported that he had overheard the MCG sprinkers during the night. Frank Tyson reckoned that
"had he not acted there can be little doubt that there would have been hardly any wicket left on the Monday". An official enquiry by the Victorian Cricket Association and the Melbourne Cricket Club denied any watering of the playing area during the match and claimed that the wicket must have sweated under the tarpaulin despite the baking heat and dry wind. Some scientists theorised that the dry weather drew up water from underground and the wicket watered itself, but a Sydney reporter asked "has anyone worked out how the wicket rolled itself out to close up all those cracks". Wisden stated "large cracks were evident on Saturday yet on Monday these had closed and for a time the surface behaved more kindly to batsmen". Fortunately as England were due to bat Hutton thought he gained from the incident and did not complain, but Ian Johnson said "It was like losing the toss twice over". The proof of the pudding wicket was that Len Maddocks (47), Ian Johnson (33 not out) and Bill Johnston (11) added another 50 runs before Statham (5/60) finished off the innings, the first time he had taken five wickets in a Test innings.

England – Second Innings
Starting 40 runs behind Len Hutton (42) and Bill Edrich (13) evened the score for the first wicket, Hutton was so ill that he could not take off his pads for an hour after returning to the dressing room, but remained slumped in a corner. Peter May held the innings together with a classic 91 then "Barnacle" Bailey (24 not out off 144 balls) held up one end while Evans (22) and Wardle (38) made runs at the other. Bill Johnston was bowling Slow-Left-Arm spin, which Wardle had hit all over the ground when the Australians played Yorkshire in 1953 and he had hit 7 fours in his 38. Keith Miller told him "Now, Bill, don't bowl that slow stuff against to Wardle", told him to bowl quicker and Johnston took the last 3 wickets for 6 runs. His 5/85 was the only Australian five wicket haul in the series, and England were all out for 279.

Australia – Second Innings
Australia were set 240 to win, but Tyson had Arthur Morris caught for 4 by Colin Cowdrey. As "Les Favell got going, his wicket went tumbling", bowled for 30 by Bob Appleyard. Neil Harvey and Richie Benaud took the score to 75/2 by stumps and over 50,000 supporters came on the fifth day to see them knock off the remaining runs, but what they got was "the fastest and most frightening sustained spell of fast bowling seen in Australia". as Tyson sent Australia crashing to 111 all out – the dreaded Triple Nelson – and England won by 128 runs. Australia added only 36 runs that morning as Tyson took 6/16 off 6.3 eight-ball overs, 7/27 in the innings, hurtling down from the Richmond End and slightly into the breeze, but at enormous pace. The first wicket to fall was "a phenomenal piece of cricket" described by Neville Cardus as "Harvey flicked the seventh ball of the morning (from Tyson) round the corner and this time Evans dived full length to the right, clutching the ball in his out-stretched glove". Evans had anticipated Harvey's stroke and had moved to leg before making his "prodigious leap"  and "thought this almost his best catch". Richie Benaud chopped the ball onto his stumps trying to hook, Keith Miller managed to block four shooters in a row from Statham, edging the last for four through his pads, but at the other end saw the ball ricochet off the shoulder of his bat, and deflect off Len Hutton's outstretched hand for Bill Edrich to leap backwards and take the catch. Graeme Hole in his final Test innings, edged Brian Statham behind to Evans, Len Maddocks couldn't repeat his first innings heroics and was bowled first ball by a Tyson yorker that he dug out, only to see it spin back into his wicket. Ray Lindwall, fearing a Tyson bouncer after Sydney, played back to a full-length ball and was lbw for a second ball duck, Ron Archer made 15 before he was bowled by a Statham yorker, and Bill Johnston lasted only three balls before he hung his bat outside off-stump and was caught behind off Tyson to end the innings on 111, with captain Ian Johnson unbeaten with 4. The match finished well before lunch and the Melbourne Cricket Club caterers were left with thousands of unsold meat pies as the crowd deserted the ground.

Result
Len Hutton was delirious with happiness. He, England's first professional captain, was leading a triumphant team – in Australia!...He frowns on 'sleeping with the enemy' and counsels against our going into the Aussie dressing-room to fraternise with our affable opponents. In Melbourne, however, he could afford to be magnanimous. After the game he threw open the door of the English dressing room. The champagne flowed, flooding well into the night.
Frank Tyson
The Third Test cemented Tyson's "Typhoon" reputation and made him a sporting legend as England beat Australia by 128 runs to take a 2–1 lead in the series. He became only the fifth England bowler to take seven wickets in a Test innings in Australia after Tom Richardson (8/94), George Lohmann (8/35 and 8/58), Wilfred Rhodes (7/56 and 8/68) and Doug Wright (7/105). The Test was referred to in the Goon Show, in the original script of episode 15 of their fifth series "1985" broadcast on 5 January 1955 Neddie Seagoon wanders into an antique shop in 1985 and sees an old cricket bat. The shop-owner tells him "As a matter of fact this bat was used in the very last test by an Australian opening bat, you can see it's quite unmarked". The bat's ownership was changed to Len Hutton when broadcast because of the England captain's poor form.

Fourth Test – Adelaide

Preliminaries

Despite the form of Peter Loader and Alec Bedser in the recent tour matches England kept their winning team from Melbourne and Len Hutton even kept Bill Edrich as his opening partner. The Australian selection process was more confused. Vice-captain Arthur Morris was somewhat unfairly blamed for the Sydney and Melbourne disasters and was dropped in favour of Colin McDonald, then Les Favell was dropped after his failure in the recent tour match and Morris was recalled on the morning of the match. Graeme Hole had also played poorly for South Australia against the MCC was dropped and Jim Burke was recalled. Worse for Australia Ray Lindwall pulled a muscle in the Queensland-Victoria game and Alan Davidson had to be brought in. Though South Australia's Gil Langley had recovered and made a fifty against the MCC Victoria's Len Maddocks kept his place as wicket-keeper due to his batting in the Third Test and was booed by the local crowd, who cheered Langley when he visited the Australian dressing room.

Australia – First Innings
Ian Johnson won the toss in the sweltering 100 °F/38 °C heat and chose to bat on the best surface seen since Brisbane. Again nine Australian batsmen got into double figures, Colin McDonald (48) and Arthur Morris (25) added 59 for the first wicket, and Keith Miller made 44. Hutton made himself unpopular with his deliberately slow over rates so that he could rest his exhausted fast bowlers, and Brian Statham ripped the nail off his right big toe and had to hack a hole in his boot so he could continue to bowl. It was Bob Appleyard (3/58) who made the breakthrough, dismissing MacDonald, Miller and Benaud, with Tyson (3/85) and Bailey (3/39) in support as Australia fell to 229/8. Len Maddocks (69) justified his selection and was the only man to pass fifty, adding 92 for the ninth wicket with Ian Johnson (41) until Bailey removed the captain. Maddocks was run out two runs later and Australia were dismissed for 323 on the afternoon of the second day.

England – First Innings
Len Hutton (80) and Bill Edrich (20) saw England though to stumps and took the score to 60 the next morning before the first wicket fell. Cowdrey (79) added 99 with Hutton looking certain for a century before he smashed the ball into Alan Davidson's back, where it lobbed up for an easy, if painful, catch. Colin Cowdrey and Denis Compton (44) took the score to 230/3 by the end of the day and England were confident of a first innings lead, but they both fell early next morning and though the lower middle order all got going the tail collapsed again and the last four wickets fell for 20 runs and the last seven wickets for 111. Still 341 was England's highest score so far in the series and gave them a slim 18 run lead, the leg-spinner Richie Benaud (4/120) doing most of the work.

Australia – Second Innings
In the Australian second innings Hutton made his bowling changes with great cunning, removing Tyson and Statham after a few overs and bringing on Bob Appleyard whose 3/12 accounted for Morris, Burke and Harvey before the day was out, leaving the home side on 69/3. Expecting more spin the next day the Aussies were confronted by Tyson (3/47) and Statham (3/38) at their most lethal. Statham's motto was "if they miss, I hit". and he bowled MacDonald before a run was added, then bowled Miller and caught Maddocks lbw. Frank Tyson took care of Benaud and Archer and 69/3 was soon 83/8. Alan Davidson (23) added some respectability to the lower order, but Australia were out for 111 and the dreaded Triple Nelson had struck again.

England second innings
England needed only 94 runs to win the Test, win the series and retain the Ashes, but Miller (3/40) had other ideas, sending Hutton, Edrich and Cowdrey back to the pavilion for 18 and catching Peter May off Bill Johnston (2/20). Denis Compton (34 not out) saw England through and Godfrey Evans came in at the fall of the 5th wicket to hit the winning runs with a boundary.

Result
England beat Australia by 5 wickets to take a 3–1 lead in the series and retain the Ashes. It was the first time any touring team had won a series in Australia since 1932–33. They were only the second touring team to win there from behind after J.W.H.T Douglas's 1911–12 England Team. The England celebrations lasted through the night, starting in the dressing room before moving on to the South Australian Cricket Association Committee Room and the team hotel before moving round the city, consuming 56 bottles of champagne at the hotel alone. Bill Edrich –  the life and soul of any party – climbed the marble pillar in the lounge of Glenelg's Pier Hotel and sung Ginger.

Fifth Test – Sydney

Preliminaries
The only change in the England team was that Bill Edrich was dropped for poor form and replaced by Tom Graveney, who became Hutton's fourth opening partner of the series. Colin Cowdrey had a broken nose from fielding at Adelaide and Trevor Bailey had a broken finger from playing Victoria, but both still played, though Bailey did not bowl in the Test. With an eye to the imminent tour of the West Indies the Australian selectors picked debutants Peter Burge and Bill Watson and Les Favell and Ray Lindwall returned to the side. To make way Arthur Morris, Bill Johnston, Ken Archer and Jim Burke were dropped (Morris, Johnston and Archer having already been picked for the West Indies).

England – First Innings
The first three days were lost to heavy rain and only 13 hours play were available when the captains went out on the fourth afternoon to toss, Johnson winning and putting England in to bat. Hutton was out quickly, but Graveney effortlessly stroked his way to 111 out of 182 in two and a half hours, adding 176 with May (79). Crowdey was out first ball, but Compton (84) and Bailey (72) added 134 and Hutton declared on 371/7, easily England's best score of the series. Amazingly Bailey gave Lindall his wicket to record his 100th England wicket in the mistaken belief that with was the fast bowler's last Ashes Test and "at one stroke achieved heights of Australian popularity to which he could scarcely have aspired". Lindwall ending with (3/77) and his captain (3/68).

Australia – First Innings
Colin McDonald responded with 72, adding 53 for the first wicket with Bill Watson (18), but Maddocks (32) was the only other batsman to make more than 20 as the England spinner Johnny Wardle (5/79) worked his way through their batting with a mixture of orthodox slow left arm spin mixed with chinamen and reverse googlies. Johnson was run out when the last wicket fell for 221 and believed that the follow on had been avoided, but due to the three days lost Hutton could enforce the follow on despite being only 150 runs ahead and promptly did so. It was the first time Australia had followed on for eighteen years, when a young Hutton had made his world record 364 at the Kensington Oval in 1938.

Australia second innings
Macdonald (37) watched the wickets fall about him again and at 29/3 Australia were in danger of an innings defeat as Wardle (3/51) struck again. Miller (28), Burge (18 not out) and Benaud (22) stopped the rot, but Hutton did not concede the draw until he brought himself on in the final over, bowling Benaud with the last ball of the series. Australia finally ended on 118/6, still 32 runs short of making England bat again.

Result
England drew with Australia to win the series 3–1

The Ashes Calypso
The calypso singer Lord Kitchener released a single The Ashes (Australia vs MCC 1955) to celebrate their victory Play Recording:

Tyson taught them a lesson that can't be forgotten,
Tyson taught them a lesson that can't be forgotten,
We began quietly, but we came back with victory,
Good captaincy from Len Hutton, but the honours must go to Typhoon Tyson.

Australia's tragedy, it began at Sydney,
Magnificent Tyson, had their batsmen beaten,
He went on to give us, a victory for Christmas,
Good captaincy from Len Hutton, but the honours must go to Typhoon Tyson.

More shocks for Australia, the Melbourne disaster,
Les Favell got going, his wicket went tumbling,
We got them out cheaply, and score second victory,
Good captaincy from Len Hutton, but the honours must go to Typhoon Tyson.

The bowling was so good, it remind them of Larwood,
Maginificent Tyson finished with seven for twenty-seven,
They had no excuses, we regained the Ashes,
Good captaincy from Len Hutton, but the honours must go to Typhoon Tyson.

1954–55 Test Series Averages
source As was the convention of the time gentleman amateurs have their initials in front of their surname and professional players have their initials after their name, if used at all. The Australians were all amateurs until the Packer Revolution, even though they played like professionals. In a dinner for the teams by the Australian Board of Control Hutton gave a speech asking when the Australian players were going to see some of the £100,000 the ABC had made from the 1953 tour of England "You rich men get all the money – why don't the players get more?" and asked "Miller and Lindwall have done so much for Australian cricket – what are you going to do for them?" and suggested they should have a benefit.

References

Bibliography
 Peter Arnold, The Illustrated Encyclopedia of World Cricket, W. H. Smith, 1985
 Ashley Brown, The Pictorial History of Cricket, Bison, 1988
 Ken Kelly and David Lemmon, Cricket Reflections : Five Decades of Cricket Photographs, Heinemann, 1985
 E.W. Swanton, Swanton in Australia with MCC 1946–1975, Fontana/Collins, 1975
 Frank Tyson, In the Eye of the Typhoon: The Inside Story of the MCC Tour of Australia and New Zealand 1954/55, Parrs Wood Press, 2004
 Bob Willis and Patrick Murphy, Starting With Grace: A Pictorial Celebration of Cricket, 1864–1986, Stanley Paul, 1986

Further reading
 John Arlott, Australian Test Journal. A Diary of the Test Matches Australia v. England 1954–55, The Sportsman's Book Club, 1956
 John Arlott, John Arlott's 100 Greatest Batsmen, MacDonald Queen Anne Press, 1986
 Sidney Barnes, The Ashes Ablaze: The M. C. C. Australian tour,1954–55, Kimber, 1955
 Bill Frindall, The Wisden Book of Test Cricket 1877–1978, Wisden, 1979
 Arthur Gilligan, The Urn Returns: A Diary of the 1954–55 M. C. C. Tour of Australia, Deutsch, 1955
 Tom Graveney and Norman Miller, The Ten Greatest Test Teams  Sidgewick and Jackson, 1988
 Gideon Haigh, The Summer Game: Australia in Test Cricket 1949–71, Text Publishing, 1997
 Chris Harte, A History of Australian Cricket, Andre Deutsch, 1993
 Alan Hill, Daring Young Men: MCC Tour to Australia – 1954–55, Methuen Publishing Ltd, 2004
 Keith Miller, Cricket Crossfire, Oldbourne Press, 1956
 Ian Peebles, The Ashes 1954–55, Hodder and Stoughton, 1955
 Playfair Cricket Annual 1955
 Ray Robinson, On Top Down Under, Cassell, 1975
 Alan Ross, Australia 55: A Journal of the MCC Tour, Joseph, 1955
 E.W. Swanton and C.B. Fry, Test Matches of 1954/55 Victory in Australia, The Daily Telegraph, 1955
 E.W. Swanton (ed), Barclay's World of Cricket, Willow, 1986
 Roy Webber, The Australians in England, A Record of the 21 Australian Cricket Tours of England 1878–1953, Hodder & Stoughton, 1953
 Crawford White, England Keep the Ashes: The Record of the England and M. C. C. Tour of Australia, 1954–55, News Chronicle, 1955
 Wisden Cricketers' Almanack 1956, "MCC in Australia and New Zealand, 1954–55"

External links
Test Match Special commentry on the 1954–55 Ashes Series

Ashes series
Ashes series
Ashes series
Ashes series
Australian cricket seasons from 1945–46 to 1969–70
International cricket competitions from 1945–46 to 1960
The Ashes